Carol Haerer (1933-2002) was an American artist known for abstract painting in the vein of Minimalism and Lyrical abstraction.

Career
Haerer is best known for her White Painting series of works. Her work was included in the Lyrical Abstraction exhibition at the Aldrich Museum of Contemporary Art, Ridgefield, Connecticut. In 1990, the Rothko Foundation at Artists Space sponsored a three-person exhibition of Ed Clark, Carol Haerer and Ted Kanshare, which was reviewed by Arts Magazine. Her large paintings were often stretched on supports with rounded corners, creating a sense of elegant objecthood as well as luminous surface quality.

Education
Haerer graduated from the University of Nebraska, Lincoln in 1954, and went on receive a Fulbright Fellowship to attend the Sorbonne in Paris for two years. She then attended the University of California, Berkeley, where she received a Masters of Fine Arts.

Awards and honors

Haerer received a Guggenheim Fellowship for Creative Art in 1988.

Collections
Her work is included in the collections of the Solomon R. Guggenheim Museum, the Whitney Museum of American Art, the Brooklyn Museum, the Sheldon Museum of Art, the Spencer Museum of Art, the Museum of Nebraska Art, the Hood Museum, the Zimmerli Art Museum, and other collections.

References

1933 births
2002 deaths
American artists
University of California alumni
University of Nebraska alumni
University of Paris alumni
20th-century American women artists
20th-century American people